İlham Tanui Özbilen (born William Biwott Tanui on 5 March 1990 in Kocholwo, Kenya) is a middle distance runner now representing Turkey. He is coached by Kenyan Patrick Sang.

Career in Kenya
Özbilen, then competing as William Biwott Tanui, won the 1500 metres at the 2009 World Athletics Final in Thessaloniki, Greece. He holds the current world junior record in the mile run with his clocking of 3:49.29 minutes, achieved in Oslo on 3 July 2009. He was also part of the Kenyan team (with Gideon Gathimba, Geoffrey Kipkoech Rono and Augustine Kiprono Choge) that set a new world record of 14:36.23 in the rarely contested 4 x 1500 metres relay at the 2009 Memorial Van Damme Golden League meeting in Brussels, Belgium.

Turkish citizenship
He switched allegiance to Turkey in June 2011, changing his name to İlham Tanui Özbilen. His surname was given him by his godfather and manager Önder Özbilen, who persuaded him in December 2010 in Kenya to immigrate to Turkey. He moved in February 2011 to Turkey, and was naturalized on 8 June 2011. While he would normally have been ineligible to internationally represent his adoptive country until 8 June 2013, it was announced in February 2012 that he had received permission from the International Association of Athletics Federations (IAAF) to compete for Turkey starting with the 2012 World Indoor Championships in Istanbul.

İlham Tanui Özbilen won the silver medal for Turkey in the 1500 m event at the 2012 IAAF World Indoor Championships held in Istanbul, Turkey. Özbilen also represented Turkey at the 2012 Summer Olympics in London, where he made the final of the 1500 meters, finishing 8th, with a time of 3:36.72. At the 2013 Mediterranean Games held in Mersin, Turkey, he became gold medalist in the 1500 m event.

At the 2013 Islamic Solidarity Games held in Palembang, Indonesia, he won a gold medal in the 1500 m event, a bronze medal in the 800 m event and a silver medal in the 4x400 m relay event with his teammates Batuhan Altıntaş, Halit Kılıç and Mehmet Güzel.

In 2015, Özbilen competed in the 1500 metres at the European Indoor Championships. He came second place with a time 3:37.74, behind Jakub Holuša, the national record holder in the 1500 metres for the Czech Republic.

World records
4x1500 m relay: 14:36.23 minutes (2009, Memorial Van Damme)

International competitions

References

1990 births
Living people
People from Elgeyo-Marakwet County
Kenyan male middle-distance runners
Turkish male middle-distance runners
Olympic athletes of Turkey
Athletes (track and field) at the 2012 Summer Olympics
Athletes (track and field) at the 2016 Summer Olympics
World Athletics Championships athletes for Turkey
Naturalized citizens of Turkey
Kenyan emigrants to Turkey
Mediterranean Games gold medalists for Turkey
Athletes (track and field) at the 2013 Mediterranean Games
Athletes (track and field) at the 2018 Mediterranean Games
Mediterranean Games medalists in athletics
IAAF World Athletics Final winners
Islamic Solidarity Games competitors for Turkey